Catherine Ponder (born February 14, 1927) is an American minister and founder of Unity Church Worldwide, affiliated with the Unity Church, and author of several New Thought books on mainly focused on the theme of prosperity. She was born in Hartsville, South Carolina.

Ponder has written more than a dozen books, which include such bestsellers as her Millionaires of the Bible series. She is a minister of the non-denominational Unity faith and has served in Unity Churches since 1956, and heads a global ministry in Palm Desert, California.

After studying business she enrolled in the Unity Ministerial School, receiving a Bachelor of Science in Education in 1956. She was ordained as a Unity Church minister in 1958, with an initial ministry in Birmingham, Alabama (1958–61). She founded ministries in Austin, Texas (1961–69), San Antonio (1969–73) and Palm Desert, California in 1973, where she remains minister.

Ponder wrote her first prosperity book The Dynamic Laws of Prosperity in the early 1960s while living in Birmingham, Alabama. Her life expanded dramatically while she was in the midst of finishing that book. She married and moved to the southwest, where her husband taught at the University of Texas. Following her husband's death, her life changed again. In the early 1970s, she moved to San Antonio, Texas. There she remarried and wrote a sequel to that earlier book, entitled Open Your Mind to Prosperity.

She has given lectures on the universal principles of prosperity in most of the major cities of America, as well as in smaller ones. Ponder has given interviews on television and radio, as well as numerous interviews by the print media.

Ponder's The Dynamic Laws of Prosperity was included among 50 'success classics' in an eponymous book  by personal development scholar Tom Butler-Bowdon. Her Open Your Mind To Prosperity was separately featured in his book 50 Prosperity Classics.

Bibliography 

 The Dynamic Laws of Prosperity (1962, released in French in 1980 by Les Éditions Un monde différent))
 The Prosperity Secrets of the Ages (1964)
 The Dynamic Laws of Healing (1966)
 The Healing Secrets of the Ages (1967)
 Pray and Grow Rich (1968)
 Open Your Mind To Prosperity (1971)
 The Millionaires of Genesis (1976)
 The Millionaire Moses (1977)
 The Millionaire Joshua (1978)
 The Millionaire from Nazareth (1979)
 Open Your Mind To Receive (1983, 2008. Released in French in 1997 by Les Éditions Un monde différent)
 Secret of Unlimited Prosperity (1983)
 The Prospering Power of Prayer (1983)
 Dare to Prosper! (1983)
 The Dynamic Laws of Prayer (1987)
 A Prosperity Love Story: Rags to Enrichment (memoir) (2003). DeVorss & Company. pp. 224 
 Giving Thanks: The Art of Tithing by Paula Langguth Ryan (foreword  by Catherine Ponder) (2005) 
 The Prospering Power of Love (2006 Revised & Updated)

References

External links 
Commentary on Ponder's classic The Dynamic Laws of Prosperity
Books by Catherine Ponder
Unity Church Worldwide - Catherine Ponder, Founding Minister

1927 births
Possibly living people
American clergy
American women writers
People from Hartsville, South Carolina